Heracles, also known as Hercules, is a Greek and Roman mythological hero known for his strength and far-ranging adventures. He is one of the most commonly portrayed figures from classical mythology in the popular culture of the 20th and 21st centuries.

Filmography

Italian, 1950s–60s

A series of nineteen Italian Hercules movies of the "Sword and sandal" film genre were made in the late 1950s and early 1960s. The first and most successful of these was Hercules, starring Steve Reeves. Other actors who played Hercules in these films were Gordon Scott, Kirk Morris, Mickey Hargitay, Mark Forest, Alan Steel, Dan Vadis, Brad Harris, Reg Park, Peter Lupus (billed as Rock Stevens), and Michael Lane. The films are listed below by their American release titles, and the titles in parentheses are the original Italian titles with English translation.  
 
Hercules (Le fatiche di Ercole / The Labors of Hercules, 1958) starring Steve Reeves
Hercules Unchained (Ercole e la regina di Lidia / Hercules and the Queen of Lydia, 1959) starring Steve Reeves
Goliath and the Dragon (La vendetta di Ercole / The Revenge of Hercules, 1960) starring Mark Forest (this Hercules film had its title changed to Goliath when it was distributed in the U.S.)
Hercules Vs The Hydra (Gli amori di Ercole / The Loves of Hercules, 1960) co-starring Mickey Hargitay & Jayne Mansfield
Hercules and the Captive Women (Ercole alla conquista di Atlantide / Hercules at the Conquest of Atlantis, 1961) starring Reg Park (alternate U.S. title: Hercules and the Haunted Women)
Hercules in the Haunted World (Ercole al centro della terra / Hercules at the Center of the Earth) 1961 (directed by Mario Bava) starring Reg Park
Hercules in the Valley of Woe (Maciste contro Ercole nella valle dei guai / Maciste vs Hercules in the Vale of Woe) starring Frank Gordon as Hercules, 1961
Ulysses Against the Son of Hercules (Ulisse contro Ercole / Ulysses vs Hercules) starring Mike Lane, 1962
The Fury of Hercules (La furia di Ercole / The Fury of Hercules) starring Brad Harris, 1962  (alternate U.S. title: The Fury of Samson)
Hercules, Samson and Ulysses (Ercole sfida Sansone / Hercules Challenges Samson) starring Kirk Morris, 1963
Hercules vs Moloch (Ercole contro Molock / Hercules vs Molock)  starring Gordon Scott, 1963 (a.k.a. The Conquest of Mycenae)
Son of Hercules in the Land of Darkness (Ercole l'invincibile / Hercules the Invincible) starring Dan Vadis, 1964. (This was originally a Hercules film retitled "Son of Hercules" for inclusion in the U.S. syndicated television package The Sons of Hercules).
Hercules vs The Giant Warriors (il trionfo di Ercole / The Triumph of Hercules) starring Dan Vadis, 1964  (alternate U.S. title: Hercules and the Ten Avengers)
Hercules Against Rome (Ercole contro Roma / Hercules vs Rome) starring Alan Steel, 1964
Hercules Against the Sons of the Sun (Ercole contro i figli del sole / Hercules vs the Sons of the Sun) starring Mark Forest, 1964
Samson and His Mighty Challenge (Ercole, Sansone, Maciste e Ursus: gli invincibili / Hercules, Samson, Maciste and Ursus: The Invincibles) starring Alan Steel as Hercules, 1964 (a.k.a. Combate dei Gigantes or Le Grand Defi)
Hercules and the Tyrants of Babylon (Ercole contro i tiranni di Babilonia / Hercules vs the Tyrants of Babylon) starring Rock Stevens,  1964
Hercules and the Princess of Troy (No Italian title) starring Gordon Scott, 1965 (a.k.a. Hercules vs the Sea Monster)  --- This U.S./ Italian co-production was made as a pilot for a Charles Band-produced TV series that never materialized & it was later distributed as a feature film.
Hercules the Avenger (Sfida dei giganti / Challenge of the Giants) starring Reg Park, 1965 (This film was composed mostly of re-edited footage from the two 1961 Reg Park Hercules films.)

A number of English-dubbed Italian films that featured the Hercules name in their title were never intended to be Hercules movies by their Italian creators.
Hercules Against the Moon Men, Hercules Against the Barbarians,  Hercules Against the Mongols and Hercules of the Desert were all originally Maciste films in Italy. (See "Maciste" section below)
Hercules and the Black Pirate and Hercules and the Treasure of the Incas were both originally Samson movies in Italy. (See "Samson" section below)
Hercules, Prisoner of Evil was originally an Ursus film in Italy. (See "Ursus" section below)
Hercules and the Masked Rider was actually originally a Goliath movie in Italy. (See "Goliath" section below)
None of these films in their original Italian versions involved the Hercules character in any way. Likewise, most of the Sons of Hercules movies shown on American TV in the 1960s had nothing to do with Hercules in their original Italian versions.

Other films

The Warrior's Husband (1933), directed by Walter Lang, in which Hercules, played by Tiny Sandford, is a clumsy, cowardly, comic character.
The Popeye the Sailor cartoon Greek Mirthology portrays Popeye as Hercules.
The Three Stooges Meet Hercules (1962), American comedy with the Three Stooges and Samson Burke playing Hercules.
Jason and the Argonauts (1963), with Hercules as a member of crew of the Argo, searching for the golden fleece but leaving before they get there.
Hercules (1964), Indian Hindi-language adventure film by Shriram in the style of the Italian peplums, starring Dara Singh in the titular role of the hero.
Son of Hercules (1964), another Indian film in Hindi by Sultan. It follows the story of Hercules' son and his fight with a dragon.
Tarzan Aur Hercules (1964), Indian Hindi-language action film by Mahmood, featuring a character based on Hercules who helps Tarzan win a princess.
Sheba and Hercules (1967), Indian Hindi-language action film by B. S. Chowdhary. It features characters with allusions to Hercules and the Queen of Sheba.
Hercules in New York (1970), with Arnold Schwarzenegger.
Hercules (1983) and its sequel The Adventures of Hercules (1985) with Lou Ferrigno as the title character.
Hercules and the Amazon Women (1994), Star Kevin Sorbo
Hercules and the Lost Kingdom (1994), Star Kevin Sorbo
Hercules and the Circle Fire (1994), Star Kevin Sorbo
Hercules in the Underworld (1994), Star Kevin Sorbo
Hercules in the Maze of the Minotaur (1994), Star Kevin Sorbo
Hercules (1997), American animated feature, produced by Walt Disney Feature Animation.
The Amazing Feats of Young Hercules (1997), in which Hercules must complete four feats of heroism with his weasel companion Falina.
Jason and the Argonauts (2000), in which Hercules (Brian Thompson) travels all the way to Colchis with the Argonauts.
Little Hercules (2009), Little Hercules travels from Mt. Olympus to live life as a mortal in Los Angeles played by Richard Sandrak.
Immortals (2011), in which Heracles is played as one of the Olympian gods by Steve Byers.
The Legend of Hercules (2014), directed by Renny Harlin and played by Kellan Lutz.
Hercules (2014), directed by Brett Ratner and played by Dwayne Johnson. Based on the comic series by Steve Moore.
Hercules Reborn (2014), directed by Nick Lyon and played by John Morrison.
Thor: Love and Thunder (2022) directed by Taika Waititi introduces Hercules into the MCU in the end-credits, played by Brett Goldstein

Television
 The Mighty Hercules, an animated series produced in 1963 by Adventure Cartoon Productions in connection with Trans-Lux Television.
 Space Sentinels (1977)
 The Freedom Force (TV Series) (1978)
 Hercules: The Legendary Journeys, a TV series and several made-for-television movies in 1995–1999 starring Kevin Sorbo.
 Hercules: The Animated Series, a TV series based upon the 1997 Disney film.
 Young Hercules, a spin-off of Hercules: The Legendary Journeys which aired on Fox Kids from September 12, 1998 to May 12, 1999, starring Ryan Gosling.
 Hercules (TV miniseries), a 2005 television mini-series done by Hallmark Entertainment.
 Hercules is the mentor and ancestor of Herry Hercules from Class of the Titans.
 Hercules appears in the BBC One series Atlantis where he is portrayed by Mark Addy.
 Hercules appears in the ABC fantasy drama Once Upon a Time, portrayed by Jonathan Whitesell.
 Hercules appears in the animated series DuckTales reboot, this version of him is depicted as a stork.

Video games and pinball
 Hercules (1979), Popularly considered to be the largest pinball machine made, Hercules was an oversized pinball machine released by Atari.
 The Return of Heracles (1983) is a video game designed by Stuart Smith and released for Atari 8-bit and Commodore 64 computers.  It is a turn-based adventure/rpg designed around the Twelve Labours of Heracles, though you could play as any or all of several characters including Pegasus and Achilles. Its design is similar to Smith's earlier game Ali Baba and the Forty Thieves.
 Hercules is the title character of the Hercules no Eikō series (1987-2008)
 Glory of Heracles (2008), a video game for the Nintendo DS, in which you play a boy who lost his memories but is believed to be Heracles.  Along his journey, he finds that others have also lost their memories and also believes they are Heracles.  The game's story plot does not reflect the actual story of the mythology.
 Disney's Hercules (1997), based on the animated film of the same name.
A variation of the Disney version appears as a supporting character in Kingdom Hearts (2002) (voiced by Sean Astin), Kingdom Hearts: Chain of Memories (2004), Kingdom Hearts II (2005) (voiced by Tate Donovan), Kingdom Hearts 358/2 Days (2009), Kingdom Hearts: Birth by Sleep (2010) (voiced by Josh Keaton), Kingdom Hearts coded (2008), and Kingdom Hearts III (2019) (voiced by Tate Donovan).
 Herc's Adventures (1997) is a comedy adventure-role-playing video game on the PlayStation where you must complete many tasks, many of which are not actually credited to Hercules anywhere else (such as slaying Medusa).
 Hercules: The Legendary Journeys (2000), based upon the TV series of the same name. Released to Nintendo 64 and Game Boy Color. The game pits Hercules against his evil half-brother Ares.
 Empire Earth (2001) features a character named Hierakles in the first mission of the Greek campaign, where he is the chieftain of an Anatolian tribe who must lead his people to Thessaly before the winter season sets in.
 Hercules (as Heracles) is a hero character in Age of Mythology (2002) and Age of Empires: Mythologies (2008) for the Nintendo DS.
 In the Japanese visual novel Fate/stay night (2004) as well as its anime adaptation, Hercules (as Heracles) appears as the Berserker servant (voiced by Tadahisa Saizen), one of seven heroic spirits summoned to fight in the Holy Grail War. He has twelve lives to represent the twelve labors he underwent for immortality.
 Heracles: Battle with the Gods (2006) is a Nintendo DS & PlayStation 2 game where he must free Pegasus from the clutches of his uncle the evil god Poseidon.
 DragonFable (2006) by Artix Entertainment features a parody of the 12 labours in the form of a quest chain set by a chicken/cow god named Zeuster.
 Rise of the Argonauts (2008), a video game for the Xbox 360 and PlayStation 3. Hercules appears as one of Jason's Argonauts during the game, as a NPC party character.
 God of War III (2010), Hercules is a boss character and half-brother of the main character Kratos. He is portrayed as sinister and jealous of Kratos, believing Kratos was Zeus' favored son and comparing Kratos' tasks to have been more intense than Hercules' Twelve Labours. Hercules fights Kratos to claim the throne as God of War, which was left vacant after Zeus stripped Kratos of his powers, declaring it his thirteenth unofficial and final labour. He was voiced by Kevin Sorbo, who "reprised" the role from Hercules: The Legendary Journeys. Kratos himself has some similarities to Hercules, specifically performing tasks for the gods to gain atonement for slaying his own family.
 God of War: Ascension (2013), Hercules appears in the multiplayer mode on the map called Forum of Hercules, modeled after the location of the boss fight in God of War III. Here, he acts as an environmental obstacle for players, and is the final boss for the Trials of the Gods game mode. Kevin Sorbo reprised the role.
 Smite (2014), a video game in which he is known as the "Champion of Rome". He is depicted as a tall broad-shouldered man in his thirties with a tiny head and a humongous club. He also has another appearance, called a 'skin', which allow players to battle as a buff Kevin Sorbo with a beard and make exaggerated jokes about sorbets.
 Assassin's Creed Odyssey DLC "The Fate of Atlantis: Torment of Hades" (2019), a video game in which the protagonist fights Hercules armed with his club, in Tartarus.
In Civilization VI, Hercules appears as a summonable hero in the Heroes and Legends game mode.

Books
Percy Jackson & the Olympians: in this series by Rick Riordan, Hercules is portrayed negatively in The Titan's Curse, receiving help in getting the Golden Apples but giving no credit to his helpmate, Zoe Nightshade. He appears again as a minor antagonist in The Heroes of Olympus: The Mark of Athena.
 In author Kevin Given's novel Last Rites: The Return of Sebastian Vasilis. Thor/Hercules is an immortal that was struck by lightning several times and is now a special needs immortal that refers to himself as "The Greek god Thor." While in ancient Greece he was revered as Heracles and then in Norway he was worshipped as the thunder god which has led to his confusion about the past.
 In Henry Lion Oldie's Achaean Cycle Heracles (along with his brother Iphicles) is the protagonist of "A Hero Must Be Alone". The novel omits his labours and focuses on Amphitryon's rivalry with Zeus which motivates him to raise both Heracles and Iphicles equally heroic, despite having to falsely admit that Heracles is Zeus's son. Heracles (or Iphicles, which is left unclear) also appears in Oldie's "Odysseus Son of Laertes".

Comic books

Hercules, a 1941 DC Comics appearance in the first Wonder Woman story
Hercules, a 1958 Dell comic adapting the film from the same year
Hercules Unchained, a 1959 Dell comic adapting the sequel to the 1958 film
 The Mighty Hercules, a 1963 Gold Key comic based on the animated series of the same name
 Journey into Mystery Annual #1, a 1965 Marvel Comics comic which featured the debut of Hercules, a character who appeared in many other titles, including his own series
Hercules: Adventures of the Man-God, a 1967 Charlton comic
Hercules: The Legendary Journeys, a 1996 Topps comic based on the TV series of the same name
Hercules, a 2008 Radical comic by Steve Moore

Manga and anime
 In the manga One Piece, the character Kozuki Oden bears a resemblance to Heracles. They both possessed tremendous strength since infancy and had numerous affairs with women. Some of Oden's actions are even based on the Twelve Labors of Heracles:
 Oden defeating the Mountain God is based on the fourth labor, the capture of the Erymanthian Boar.
 Oden's attempt to help the Flower Capital citizens during a great drought by diverting a river to the city is based on the fifth labor, cleaning the Augean stables in a single day. Unlike Heracles, Oden's action ended in disaster.
 Both were rejected and disowned by one of their family members (Heracles' nemesis was Hera and Oden was disowned by his father, Kozuki Sukiyaki).
 Both were sailors (Heracles was part of the Argonauts and Oden sailed with the Whitebeard Pirates and Roger Pirates).
 Both had fathers who were rulers of their respective domains (Heracles's father was Zeus, King and ruler of Olympus; Oden's father was the head of the Kozuki family and shogun of Wano).

Music
Ercole amante (Hercules in Love) is an opera in five acts composed in 1660 by Francesco Cavalli.
Hercules (Handel) is a musical drama composed in 1744 by George Frideric Handel.
The Choice of Hercules (Handel) is an oratorio in three acts composed in 1750 by Handel.
Hercule mourant (Hercules Dying) is a tragédie en musique in five acts composed in 1761 by Antoine Dauvergne.
 Hercules and Omphale or The Power of Love is a "classical extravaganza" which premiered at Royal St. James's Theatre in London on 26 December 1864. Written by William Brough, with music composed and arranged by Wallerstein, the piece was directed by Charles Matthews. 
 "Hercules and his gifts" are mentioned in "Something Just Like This" by The Chainsmokers and Coldplay.
 Hercules (musical) is a 2019 broadway musical based on the 1997 Disney animated film.

Hercules is mentioned in the song "Surface Pressure", performed by Jessica Darrow, in Disney's Encanto when Luisa says "Was Hercules ever like 'Yo I don't want to fight Cerberus'".

See also
 Maciste
 Lockheed C-130 Is a military transport aircraft also named Hercules
 5143 Heracles a binary asteroid

References 

 
Classical mythology in popular culture